The 1928 Paris–Roubaix was the 29th edition of the Paris–Roubaix, a classic one-day cycle race in France. The single day event was held on 8 April 1928 and stretched  from Paris to its end in a velodrome in Roubaix. The winner was André Leducq from France.

Results

References

Paris–Roubaix
Paris–Roubaix
Paris–Roubaix
Paris–Roubaix